Silver lactate is an organic chemical compound, a salt of silver and lactic acid with the formula CH3CH(OH)COOAg.

Synthesis
Silver lactate can be made by the reaction of silver carbonate with lactic acid.

Physical properties
Silver lactate forms light gray crystals.

Silver lactate is soluble in water, slightly soluble in ethanol.

Silver lactate forms a crystalline hydrate of composition CH3CH(OH)COOAg•H2O.

Silver lactate is a reagent for the precipitation of uric acid.

Chemical properties
The compound reacts with triphenylphosphine gold chloride in a mixed solvent of benzene and dichloromethane to obtain colorless triphenylphosphine gold lactate.

The compound reacts with a tetraphosphine ligand, dppbpda, to obtain a coordination polymer [(dppbpda)Ag4(CH3CH(OH)COO)4]n.

References

Lactates
Silver compounds